Kißlegg (Kisslegg) is a town in the district of Ravensburg in Baden-Württemberg in Germany. Kißlegg is not far from the village of Vogt. It has a beautiful church, rich in culture and beauty.

Culture and attractions
 Castle Altes Schloss, 1560-1570
 Castle Neues Schloss, 1687
 Chapel Schlosskapelle, 1722
 Church St. Gallus und Ulrich, 1734–1738
 Cemetery chapel St. Anna, 1718–1723
 Chapel Kapelle des Heilig-Geist-Spitals
 Spital Bärenweiler
 Pilgrimage Church Maria Königin der Engel at Rötsee
 Local chapel at Immenried-Oberreute
 Natural monument Heiliger Stein in the forest near Waltershofen

Sons and daughters of the town
 Jakob Miller (1550- 1597), Catholic theologian
 Oskar Farny (1891-1983), politician (center party, CDU), Member of Reichstag, Member of Bundestag
 Adalbert Wetzel (1904-1990), president (1952–1969) and following honorary president of Bavarian football-club TSV 1860 München

References

Ravensburg (district)
Württemberg